Monika Sikora-Weinmann  (born 1 January 1958 ) is a German table tennis player . She won gold at the Paralympics and World Championships several times.

On 23 June 1993, she was awarded the Silver Laurel Leaf for her athletic achievements.

Career 
At the 1988 Summer Paralympics, she won a silver medal in Singles 4.

At the 1992 Summer Paralympics, in Barcelona, she won a gold medal in the Singles 4, and silver in the team 5 competition.

At the 1996 Summer Paralympics, she took first place with the Teams 3–5 competition.

At the 2000 Summer Paralympics, she won a silver medal in Singles 4, and in Teams 4–5.

At the 2004 Summer Paralympics, she won a gold medal in Singles 4.

At the 2008 Summer Paralympics,  she won a silver medal in  Women's team – Class 4–5.

In 1991 in Salou she became European champion in singles and with the German team. She repeated this success in 1995 in Hillerod. In 1997 she won individual silver and team gold at the European Championships in Stockholm.

Sikora competed at the world championships several times. Here she won gold with the team in 1990, 1998 and 2002. In 2002 she was also world champion in singles.

References

External links 

 German table tennis players Monika Sikora (R top) and Andrea Zimmerer face Chinese double Gai Gu (L bottom) and Guixiang Ren
 Andrea Zimmerer (L) and Monika Sikora Weinmann of Germany compete in the Women's Team - Class 4/5 Table Tennis

Living people
1958 births
Paralympic table tennis players of Germany
German female table tennis players
Table tennis players at the 1992 Summer Paralympics
Table tennis players at the 1996 Summer Paralympics
Table tennis players at the 2000 Summer Paralympics
Table tennis players at the 2004 Summer Paralympics
Table tennis players at the 2008 Summer Paralympics
Medalists at the 1992 Summer Paralympics
Medalists at the 1996 Summer Paralympics
Medalists at the 2000 Summer Paralympics
Medalists at the 2004 Summer Paralympics
Medalists at the 2008 Summer Paralympics
Paralympic gold medalists for Germany
Paralympic silver medalists for Germany